Antonio Puchades Casanova (4 June 1925 – 24 May 2013) was a Spanish footballer who played as a defensive midfielder.

Club career
Born in Sueca, Valencia, Puchades played solely for Valencia CF during his career, signing in 1945 and going on to spend 12 seasons in La Liga. In his first season with the first team, however, he appeared in only four games as the club won the national championship, becoming a regular from then onwards.

Puchades retired from football in 1958 at the age of 33, being awarded a testimonial match the following year against OGC Nice. He subsequently lost all connection to the football world, going on to work in family businesses.

International career
Puchades won 23 caps for Spain over five years. He was a member of the 1950 FIFA World Cup squad, appearing in all six games as the nation finished fourth in Brazil.

Death
Puchades, affectionally known as Tonico, died in his hometown of Sueca on 24 May 2013, two weeks shy of his 88th birthday.

Honours
La Liga: 1946–47
Copa del Generalísimo: 1948–49, 1954
Copa Eva Duarte: 1949

See also
List of one-club men

References

External links

Stats and bio at CiberChe 

1925 births
2013 deaths
Spanish footballers
Footballers from the Valencian Community
Association football midfielders
La Liga players
Valencia CF Mestalla footballers
Valencia CF players
Spain international footballers
1950 FIFA World Cup players